Area codes 805 and 820 are telephone area codes in the North American Numbering Plan (NANP) for the U.S. state of California. The numbering plan area (NPA) includes most or all of the counties of San Luis Obispo, Santa Barbara, Ventura, and the southernmost portions of Monterey County. 805 was split from area code 213 in 1957, and area code 820 was added to the NPA in 2018, creating an area code overlay.

History
Area code 805 was created in 1957, when one of the original North American area codes in California, 213, was reduced in size to provide more central office codes in the Los Angeles area.
 
In 1998, the California-Nevada Code Administration (CNCA) determined that California was under "substantial number growth" which required exhaustion mitigation in the 805 numbering plan area, by splitting the eastern part of the NPA into a new plan area with the area code 661. The split was effective on February 13, 1999 for the San Joaquin Valley, Santa Clarita Valley, and Antelope Valley.

In August 2016, the California Public Utilities Commission held a series of hearings for the decision of providing a relief area code in NPA 805 in the form of an overlay or an area code split. On May 25, 2017, the Commission approved 820 as an overlay area code. New telephone numbers of 820 area code began service in June 2018, requiring ten-digit dialing for all calls.

In addition to the municipalities below, area code 805 also serves the US military facilities in Kwajalein, Republic of the Marshall Islands with a Paso Robles prefix (805-355). This arrangement originated from the US Army's first satellite communications station having been built at nearby Camp Roberts.

Service area

Monterey County

Bradley
Gorda
Bryson
Parkfield

San Luis Obispo County

Arroyo Grande
Atascadero
Avila Beach
Baywood-Los Osos
California Valley
Cambria
Cayucos
Cholame
Grover Beach
Halcyon
Harmony
Lake Nacimiento
Los Osos
Morro Bay
Nipomo
Oceano
Paso Robles
Pismo Beach
Pozo
San Luis Obispo
San Miguel
San Simeon
Santa Margarita
Shandon
Templeton

Santa Barbara County

Ballard
Buellton
Carpinteria
Casmalia
Garey
Gaviota
Goleta
Guadalupe
Hope Ranch
Isla Vista
Lompoc
Los Alamos
Los Olivos
Mission Canyon
Mission Hills
Montecito
Orcutt
Santa Barbara
Santa Maria
Santa Ynez
Sisquoc
Solvang
Summerland
Toro Canyon
Vandenberg SFB
Vandenberg Village
Ventucopa

Ventura County

Bardsdale
Buckhorn
Camarillo
Casa Conejo
Channel Islands Beach
El Rio
Fillmore
La Conchita
Lake Sherwood
Meiners Oaks
Mira Monte
Montalvo
Moorpark
Newbury Park
Oak View
Ojai
Oxnard
Piru
Point Mugu
Port Hueneme
Santa Paula
Saticoy
Simi Valley
Somis
Thousand Oaks
Ventura

See also
List of California area codes
List of North American Numbering Plan area codes

References

External links

805/820
805/820
Monterey County, California
Santa Barbara County, California
San Luis Obispo County, California
Ventura County, California